Kim Tae-woo may refer to:

 Kim Tae-woo (singer) (born 1981), singer
 Kim Tae-woo (actor) (born 1971), actor
 Kim Tae-woo (wrestler) (born 1962), freestyle wrestler
 Kim Tae-woo (footballer) (born 1993), South Korean footballer